Waithaka is a surname of Kenyan origin. Notable people with the surname include:

Allan Waithaka, Anglican bishop in Kenya
Daniel Waithaka, Kenyan politician
Njeri Waithaka, Kenyan lawyer and criminologist
Stanley Waithaka Mburu (born 2000), Kenyan long-distance runner

Kenyan names